Sins, Lies and Angels is the fifth album by Canadian country music singer Jason McCoy. "Old Chunk of Coal" is a cover of the John Anderson song "I'm Just an Old Chunk of Coal (But I'm Gonna Be a Diamond Someday)".

Track listing

 "Please, Please" (Jason McCoy, Steve Fox) – 3:06
 "Still" (McCoy, George Ducas) – 4:07
 "Guardian Angel" (McCoy) – 3:24
 "I Lie" (McCoy) – 4:15
 "It Ain't Easy Being Me" (Chris Knight) – 3:17
 "I Feel a Sin Comin' On" (McCoy, Denny Carr) – 2:35
 "Wild Flower" (McCoy, Odie Blackmon) – 4:21
 "She Ain't Missin' Missin' Me" (McCoy, Blackmon) – 2:46
 "She'd Rather Be Lonely Than Sorry" (McCoy, Adam Mitchell) – 4:04
 "You Still Do It for Me" (McCoy, John Wiggins) – 3:01
 "Thrown Out of Love" (Colin Linden, Jim Lauderdale) – 3:45
 "Old Chunk of Coal" (Billy Joe Shaver) – 3:26

External links
 amazon.ca

Jason McCoy albums
2003 albums
Open Road Recordings albums